Seeley Lake may refer to:

Seeley Lake, Montana, a lake and census-designated place in Montana, USA
Seeley Lake Provincial Park, a lake/park in British Columbia, Canada